Ginásio do Pacaembu is an indoor sporting arena located in São Paulo, Brazil. The capacity of the arena is 3,000 and was built in 1940. It was renovated in 2001

Sports venues in São Paulo